Glenn Springs is an uninhabited place in the state of Texas, United States, which is of historical importance. The Glenn Springs area was a natural spring providing water for Apache and Kiowa routing the Grand Indian Crossing passage at Boquillas. The Comanche tribes beseech the fresh water crossing on the Comanche Trail during their equine incursions from and to the Mexican Plateau, Sierra Madre Oriental, and the Trans-Mexican Volcanic Belt regions of Mexico.

The rural settlement is located 11 miles (16 kilometers) south-southeast of the Panther Junction visitor center in what is now the Big Bend National Park, and is accessible only by high-clearance vehicle. The National Park Service maintains a back-country campground at Glenn Springs.

Military occupation
Glenn Springs was a military encampment, which was attacked by the troops of the Mexican General Pancho Villa on 5 May 1916, killing one civilian, three U.S. Army soldiers, and wounding several other troops. The Glenn Springs Raid came 57 days after the famous attack on Columbus, New Mexico.

Wax Camp
During the Spanish Texas era, candelilla was harvested in the Big Bend and Chisos Mountains region of the Trans-Pecos. The wax plant provided a malleable solid for candles used by the Spanish missions in Texas fulfilling the Franciscan and Jesuit orders.

In 1914, W.K. Ellis and C.D. Wood established a wax factory on the embankment of Glenn Springs employing a population in the mountainous Chihuahuan Desert region. By 1916, the candelillero factory consisted of a boiler room with tall smoke stacks, six large extraction vats, and a water storage system for the production of candelilla wax.

References

External links
 
 

Geography of Brewster County, Texas
Ghost towns in West Texas
History of Texas